How is a hamlet in the English county of Cumbria.

How is located eight miles due east of the city of Carlisle, to the south of Hayton. There are many hotels in Cumbria with How in the name. The name How is derived from the Old Norse word haugr meaning hill or mound.

References

External links 

Hamlets in Cumbria
Hayton, Carlisle